The State Council of the Komi Republic is the regional parliament of the Komi Republic, a federal subject of Russia. It consists of 30 deputies who are elected for five-year terms.

Among the powers of the State Council is to adopt the Constitution of the Republic of Komi, adopt and/or complement and to exercise control on the Komi legislative enforcement and execution.

The presiding officer is the Chairman of the State Council of the Komi Republic.

Elections

2015

2020

List of chairpersons

See also
 List of Chairmen of the State Council of the Komi Republic

References

Komi
Politics of the Komi Republic
Komi